Morocco competed at the 2022 Winter Olympics in Beijing, China, from 4 to 20 February 2022.

The Moroccan team consisted of one male alpine skier. Yassine Aouich was the country's flagbearer during the opening ceremony. Meanwhile a volunteer was the flagbearer during the closing ceremony.

Competitors
The following is the list of number of competitors participating at the Games per sport/discipline.

Alpine skiing

By meeting the basic qualification standards Morocco qualified one male alpine skier.

Men

References

External links
Beijing 2022 – Morocco

Nations at the 2022 Winter Olympics
2022
Winter Olympics